St. Maur may refer to:

Saint Maurus (512–584), Italian Roman Catholic saint
Congregation of Saint Maur, French Benedictine congregation established in 1621
Saint Maur International School, Tokyo, Japan, established in 1872
Baron St Maur, in the peerage of England from 1314
The Seymour family, an English family headed by the Duke of Somerset, including:
Edward St Maur , 11th Duke of Somerset (1775–1855)
Edward Seymour, 12th Duke of Somerset (1804–1885), First Lord of the Admiralty, created Earl St Maur
Ferdinand Seymour (1835–1869), son of the above, soldier, adopted Earl St Maur as a courtesy title
Archibald St Maur, 13th Duke of Somerset (1810–1891)
Algernon St Maur, 14th Duke of Somerset (1813–1894)
Algernon St Maur, 15th Duke of Somerset (1846–1923)
Susan St Maur, Duchess of Somerset (1853–1936), wife of the 15th Duke, Scottish writer and philanthropist
Harold St Maur (1869–1927), army officer and briefly Member of Parliament for Exeter

See also
 Saint-Maur (disambiguation)